The Danish Ministry of Transport is the Danish ministry in charge of coordinating and realizing the transport politics of Denmark.

The Ministry is headed by a Permanent Secretary. The Ministry of Transport employs approximately 140 staff. The daily administration and handling of tasks and assignments on transport are carried out by a number of institutions, executive agencies, corporations, councils and boards. Counting every institution and every corporation the Ministry employs around 40.000 people

History 

The Ministry of Transport was founded in 1892 under the name Ministry for Public Works ("Ministeriet for offentlige Arbejder"). In 1987 it changed name to Ministry of Traffic ("Trafikministeriet"), though briefly known as Ministry of Traffic and Communication ("Trafik- og Kommunikationsministeriet") during 1988 to 1989. In 2005 the energy sector was detached from Ministry of the Environment and attached to the Ministry of Traffic. In turn, the name was changed to Ministry of Transport and Energy; the energy department was transferred to what is now known as the Danish Ministry of Climate and Energy in 2007.

List of ministers

See also 

Wind power in Denmark

Notes

References

External links 
 Official ministry website

Transport
Transport organizations based in Denmark
Energy in Denmark
Ministries established in 1900
Denmark

de:Liste der Transportminister Dänemarks